Kevin Bruce Schneider is a lieutenant general in the United States Air Force who serves as Director of Staff of the United States Air Force since September 8, 2021. He previously served as the commander of the United States Forces Japan and the Fifth Air Force at Yokota Air Base.

Air Force career

Kevin Schneider was raised in Springfield, Virginia, and graduated from the United States Air Force Academy in 1988 with a degree in engineering science. He attended Euro-NATO Joint Jet Pilot training at Sheppard Air Force Base in Wichita Falls, Texas, and graduated in 1999. He attended F-16 Fighting Falcon training at MacDill Air Force Base, and was stationed at Osan Air Base and Misawa Air Base. In 1996, he graduated from the USAF Weapons School.  He was then stationed at Shaw Air Force Base and as a Weapons School instructor at Nellis Air Force Base. He served as the aide-de-camp for then-Chief of Staff of the Air Force General Michael E. Ryan. He served as chief of the 52nd Fighter Wing Weapons and Tactics at Spangdahlem Air Base, and commanded the 80th Fighter Squadron at Kunsan Air Base. He attended the Marine Corps War College, and served as the deputy commander of the 56th Operations Group and as vice commander of the 388th Fighter Wing. He commanded the 80th Flying Training Wing at Sheppard Air Force Base, and the 380th Air Expeditionary Wing at Al Dhafra Air Base. He then served as the chief of staff of the Pacific Air Forces and Indo-Pacific Command Headquarters in Hawaii. In February 2019, he assumed command of Fifth Air Force and United States Forces Japan.

In July 2021, he was nominated and confirmed to succeed Timothy Fay as Director of Staff of the United States Air Force. He assumed the position on September 8, 2021.

Awards and decorations

Effective dates of promotions

References

Year of birth missing (living people)
Living people
Marine Corps War College alumni
People from Springfield, Virginia
United States Air Force Academy alumni
United States Air Force generals
Recipients of the Defense Distinguished Service Medal
Recipients of the Air Force Distinguished Service Medal
Recipients of the Defense Superior Service Medal
Recipients of the Legion of Merit